Johann Ludwig Christian Carl Gravenhorst (14 November 1777 – 14 January 1857), sometimes Jean Louis Charles or Carl, was a German entomologist, herpetologist, and zoologist.

Life
Gravenhorst was born in Braunschweig. His early interest in insects was encouraged  by two of his professors, both amateur  entomologists.  He entered the University of Helmstedt  to study law in 1797. However, the death of his father two years later left him a great fortune; so he was able to change his  direction.  He enrolled at the University of Göttingen where he followed the courses of Johann Friedrich Blumenbach. He returned  to present his  thesis to Helmstädt on a subject of entomology.  He went to Paris in 1802 and there met Georges Cuvier, Pierre André Latreille, and Alexandre Brongniart. Parallel to his  studies, he assembled, thanks to his  financial means, a very important natural history collection. In 1805, he obtained  a professorial chair in Göttingen and published the following year Monographie Coleopterorum.

Among his work, Gravenhorst's studies of the parasitic wasps is especially important, but he  also worked in herpetology. He settled in Frankfurt (Oder) in 1810, teaching natural history at the university of the city. The following year, the university was transferred to Breslau. There he became director of the Breslau Natural History Museum and installed his own collections there. He started to suffer from mental disorders after 1825, stopping all scientific work in the year 1840, and withdrawing completely into himself in 1856. He died in Breslau.

Achievements
Gravenhorst was a specialist in Staphylinidae and Ichneumonidae describing many new species. He was also one of the first frog specialists.

Two species of lizards are named in his honor: Liolaemus gravenhorstii and Trachylepis gravenhorstii.

Species described by Gravenhorst

Ambystoma opacum, the marbled salamander of the eastern United States
Rana cancrivora, now Fejervarya cancrivora, the crab-eating frog of Malaysia and Thailand 
Leiocephalus schreibersii, the red-sided curly-tailed lizard of the West Indies
Xenochrophis melanzostus, the Andaman keelback snake

Works
Monographia Coleopterorum Micropterorum. Göttingen: Henricus Dieterich, xvi+248 pp, tabula. (1802)
Click for PDF:

Coleoptera Microptera Brunsvicensia nec non exoticorum quotquot exstant in collectionibus entomologorum Brunsvicensium in genera familias et species distribuit. Braunschweig: Carolus Reichard, lxvi+207 pp. Gravenhorst, J.L.C (1806)
Click for PDF:

Ichneumologia Europaea. Vratislaviae, sumtibus auctoris. 3 volumes (including supplement). pp. xxxi, 827, (4); 989; 1097, with 2 engraved plates and 2 folded tables.(1829) – Contents I: Generalia, Ichneumones, Supplementa, Indices – II: Tryphones, Trogos, Alomyas, Cryptos – III: Pimplas, Metopios, Bassos, Banchos, Ophiones, Hellwigias, Acaenitas, Xoridas, Supplementa. BHL digitised text of all 3 volumes.

Collections
Museum of Natural History at University of Wrocław
Armenology Research National Center

References

Townes, H. K. 1965. Labeling in the Gravenhorst collection of Ichneumonidae (Hymen.) Polskie Pismo Entomologiczne 35: 403–407.
Source Kraig Adler (1989). Contributions to the History of Herpetology, Society for the Study of Amphibians and Reptiles.

External links
Works by Johann Ludwig Christian Gravenhorst at the Biodiversity Heritage Library
 Gaedike, R.; Groll, E. K. & Taeger, A. 2012: Bibliography of the entomological literature from the beginning until 1863 : online database – version 1.0 – Senckenberg Deutsches Entomologisches Institut.

1777 births
1857 deaths
German entomologists
Scientists from Braunschweig
People from the Duchy of Brunswick
University of Göttingen alumni
University of Helmstedt alumni
Academic staff of European University Viadrina
Academic staff of the University of Breslau